Saint-Jérôme Aerodrome  is located adjacent to Saint-Jérôme, Quebec, Canada.

References

Buildings and structures in Saint-Jérôme
Registered aerodromes in Laurentides